Hughesville is a census-designated place (CDP) in Charles County, Maryland, United States. The population was 2,197 at the 2010 census. Truman's Place was listed on the National Register of Historic Places in 1988.

Geography

Hughesville was a tobacco market town.  The former tobacco warehouses are now used for second-hand thrift stores and boutique gift and craft shops. (Historical society article: https://www.charlescountymd.gov/Home/ShowDocument?id=3581) A multi-lane bypass of the town by Maryland Route 5 opened in February 2007, which has alleviated previous rush-hour traffic backups at the single traffic signal; beside it are two unusual side-by-side traffic roundabouts.

Because Hughesville, though small, is considered the strategic geographic center of the tri-county Southern Maryland region, it houses institutions such as the headquarters for the Southern Maryland Electric Cooperative, an animal shelter, an economic development council, a board of realtors, and a homeless women's shelter, which serve the tri-county area. There is also a Girl Scout camp. The town has no traditional grid-layout streets, but consists of merely businesses along the highway and some very small outlying housing developments. It was announced in 2013 that the College of Southern Maryland is building their fourth campus in the town.

A 5.5-MW solar farm near Hughesville generates enough power for 600 homes, and offsets the pollution of 1,600 cars.

Demographics

As of the census of 2000, there were 1,537 people, 503 households, and 407 families residing in the CDP. The racial makeup of the CDP was 82.04% White, 13.08% African American, 0.72% Native American, 2.73% Asian, 0.07% Pacific Islander, 0.13% from other races, and 1.24% from two or more races. Hispanic or Latino of any race were 0.65% of the population.

There were 503 households, out of which 36.4% had children under the age of 18 living with them, 68.2% were married couples living together, 7.4% had a female householder with no husband present, and 18.9% were non-families. 12.7% of all households were made up of individuals, and 4.6% had someone living alone who was 65 years of age or older. The average household size was 2.97 and the average family size was 3.25.

In the CDP, the population was spread out, with 26.3% under the age of 18, 6.5% from 18 to 24, 30.0% from 25 to 44, 27.3% from 45 to 64, and 10.0% who were 65 years of age or older. The median age was 38 years. For every 100 females, there were 99.4 males. For every 100 females age 18 and over, there were 97.4 males.

The median income for a household in the CDP was $90,697, and the median income for a family was $103,393. Males had a median income of $49,500 versus $36,563 for females. The per capita income for the CDP was $29,884. About 4.8% of families and 7.1% of the population were below the poverty line, including 7.9% of those under age 18 and 5.1% of those age 65 or over.

References

Census-designated places in Charles County, Maryland
Census-designated places in Maryland
"Hughesville: A Commercial and Tobacco Marketing Center" Charles County Historic Preservation Magazine https://www.charlescountymd.gov/Home/ShowDocument?id=3581